"Dig It" is a song by the English rock band the Beatles from their 1970 album Let It Be. The song is credited to Lennon/McCartney/Harrison/Starkey, and is one of the few songs to be credited to all of the Beatles. This song and the 39-second "Maggie Mae" appear on the Let It Be album, but are excluded from the Let It Be... Naked album, instead being replaced with "Don't Let Me Down". Glyn Johns' May 1969 version of the album, then titled Get Back, had a four-minute excerpt of "Dig It", which was later reduced to the much shorter version in the final album.

Recording
Several versions were recorded during the Get Back/Let It Be sessions, on 24, 26, 27, 28, and 29 January 1969, at Apple Studio. The 51-second version on the album is an extract taken from the 26 January version, which was a 15-minute jam that evolved from a loose "Like a Rolling Stone" jam. A segment of the jam session, 4 minutes and 30 seconds in length, appears in the documentary film Let It Be. The participants in that session are John Lennon on vocals and 6-string bass, George Harrison on guitar, Paul McCartney on piano, Ringo Starr on drums, George Martin on maracas and Billy Preston at the organ; also participating in the jam, but not heard on the released version, was Linda Eastman's six-year-old daughter Heather. Eastman later became McCartney's wife.

In the early part of the jam, Lennon sings the main lyric with interjections from Harrison. Heather adds wordless vocals, which in the 2021 miniseries The Beatles: Get Back, appear to be imitating Yoko Ono. As the performance winds down, Lennon exhorts the others to continue. McCartney adds a baritone backup vocal of "dig it up, dig it up, dig it up" and variations, and Lennon begins to repeat "Like a rolling stone", then, in free association manner, mentions "the FBI", "the CIA", "the BBC", "B.B. King", "Doris Day" and "Matt Busby".

The excerpt on the Let It Be album fades in on Lennon's second "Like a rolling stone" and concludes with Lennon speaking in a falsetto: "That was 'Can You Dig It?' by Georgie Wood, and now we'd like to do 'Hark, the Angels Come'". The second sentence of that line is cut off in Let It Be's film recording of the jam session. ("Wee Georgie Wood" was a 4'9" music-hall performer and child star.) The interjection actually comes from a different improvised jam recorded on the 24th. The earlier jam was much different, described by Beatles bootleg scholars Doug Sulpy and Ray Schweighardt as "sounding like a cross between the traditional 'Sailor's Hornpipe' and a slowed down rendition of Neal Hefti's 'Batman', as played on slide guitar". An excerpt from this jam (entitled "Can You Dig It?") can be heard on the "Fly on the Wall" bonus disc to Let It Be... Naked.

Personnel
 John Lennon – lead vocals, six-string bass – Fender Bass VI
 Paul McCartney – vocals in full version, piano
 George Harrison – vocals in full version, lead guitar – Fender Telecaster
 Ringo Starr – drums
 Billy Preston – Hammond organ
 George Martin – maracas
 Heather McCartney – vocals in full version
Personnel per Ian MacDonald

Notes

References

External links 
 

The Beatles bootleg recordings
The Beatles songs
Songs written by George Harrison
Songs written by Ringo Starr
Songs written by Paul McCartney
Songs written by John Lennon
Song recordings produced by Phil Spector
1970 songs
Music published by Harrisongs
Songs published by Northern Songs
Music published by Startling Music
List songs